Brampton Town railway station was the terminus of the Brampton Town Branch, in the centre of Brampton, Cumbria, England. It was opened in 1775, to work on the Earl of Carlisle's Waggonway. By 1836, a horse-driven passenger service had been implemented when the track was realigned to meet up with the Newcastle and Carlisle Railway, providing a service to Milton station, now Brampton (Cumbria) station, about a mile out of town.

The passenger service ended in 1881, however in 1913 the railway was taken over by the North Eastern Railway (NER), the track was relaid and a steam hauled service to Brampton Junction was introduced. The NER did not run passenger services between 1917 and 1920. After being incorporated into the London and North Eastern Railway it was closed to passengers on 29 October 1923 and for goods on 31 December 1923. The track was lifted shortly afterwards but the course of the line can still be easily traced over most of its length as much of it now forms a public footpath.

References

External links 
 Brampton Railway

Disused railway stations in Cumbria
Former North Eastern Railway (UK) stations
Railway stations in Great Britain opened in 1836
Railway stations in Great Britain closed in 1890
Railway stations in Great Britain opened in 1913
Railway stations in Great Britain closed in 1917
Railway stations in Great Britain opened in 1920
Railway stations in Great Britain closed in 1923
1836 establishments in England
1923 disestablishments in England